Events during the year 2014 in Northern Ireland.

Incumbents
 First Minister - Peter Robinson 
 deputy First Minister - Martin McGuiness 
 Secretary of State - Theresa Villiers

Events

January 

 1 January – New Year's Day (public holiday).
 24 January – Amnesty Northern Ireland condemned as "utterly unjustified" and an "interference with freedom of speech and artistic expression" the cancellation of a comedy play by the Reduced Shakespeare Company called The Bible: The Complete Word Of God (Abridged) due to be performed in the Theatre at the Mill in Newtownabbey  because of blasphemy alleged by the borough council led by the Democratic Unionist Party.

February 

 12 February – A Police Service of Northern Ireland vehicle crossed the border into County Donegal, leading to a Police Service investigation.

March 

 17 March – Saint Patrick's Day (public holiday).
 30 March – Mothering Sunday. Clocks went forward one hour when British Summer Time (BST) began.

April 

 18 April – Good Friday (public holiday).
 21 April – Easter Monday (public holiday).
 30 April – Sinn Féin leader Gerry Adams was arrested and questioned by serious crime detectives at Antrim police station about the murder of Jean McConville in 1972.

May 

 4 May – Gerry Adams was released without charge after four days in police custody. It was decided to send a file to the Public Prosecution Service, which would decide if criminal charges should be brought.
 5 May – May Day and Labour Day (public holiday).
 9 May – The Giro d'Italia cycle race started in Belfast.
 26 May – Spring public holiday.

June 

 15 June – Father's Day.

July 

 1 July – A Ku Klux Klan flag was taken down from a lamppost in Ballymacarrett in East Belfast. Its erection was condemned by politicians from a variety of political parties.
 12 July – Orangeman's Day (public holiday). Marching season culminates in The Twelfth celebration of the Glorious Revolution and the Battle of the Boyne.

August 

 25 August – August public holiday.

October 

 26 October – Clocks go back one hour when British Summer Time (BST) ends.
 31 October – Hallowe'en.

December 

 23 December - David Cameron agreed to a subsidy of £2 billion to help preserve local welfare budgets. President Barack Obama congratulated ' ..all the leaders involved who, once again, have shown that when there is a will and the courage to overcome the issues that have divided the people of Northern Ireland, there is a way to succeed for the benefit of all. '
 25 December – Christmas Day (public holiday).
 26 December – Boxing Day (public holiday).

Sports

Association football 

 January – Football League Cup final.

Deaths 

 12 May — Hugh Smyth, 73, Lord Mayor of Belfast
 12 September — Ian Paisley, former First Minister and founder of the DUP

See also 
 2014 in England
 2014 in Scotland
 2014 in Wales

References 

Northern Ireland